Chaudayyadanapur is a small village in Ranebennur taluk of Haveri District in Karnataka state of India. All facets of Indian civilisation (religion, art and poetry) are exemplified in an exquisite Mukteshwara temple, with the highest degree of refinement.

Introduction
Shivapur, the old name of Chaudadanapur (Chaudayyadanapur) saint, a 12th-century social reformer Basaveshwar, donated this village to Ambigara Chaudayya (a boatman). So the name is Chaudayyadanapur or Chaudadanapur.

The temple of Mukteshwar at Chaudayyadanapur in Ranebennur Taluk is a beautiful representative of the style and the high culture of that time.

The Mukteshwar Temple

The Mukteshwar Temple is a single cella temple in Jakkanachari style. Similar temples were built under the patronage of Kalachuris of Kalyani or Seuna dynasties. This temple is a jewel of architecture of the 11th–12th centuries. It was built during the heyday of the kingdom ruled by the Kalyani Chalukyas and the Seunas of Devagiri. It is dedicated to an Udbhava (spontaneously born) Lingam named Mukteshwar.

The dome of the temple is hollow and is closed by the slabs of the stupi. Shikhara of the Mukteshwara temple is 2.2 m in its axis at the base. The stupi is made of three beautiful lotiform mouldings  diminishing in size and a lotus bud with its base.

Kannada inscriptions

History

The history of Mukteshwar Temple at Chaudayyadanapur is known through seven inscriptions in medieval Kannada, engraved on large steles. They provide information on the local rulers, kings of Guttala (Gupta ascendancy), on some constructions in the temple complex, on diverse donations to the deity.

They provide the details on a prominent religious leaders. Inscriptions introduce Muktajiyar, a Lakulasaiva saint, and Shivadeva, a Virashaiva saint, who entered the place on 19 August 1225 and led there a long life of renunciation, asceticism and spiritual elevation. The legacy of this age of intense Shaivism is a jewel of architecture and sculpture.

Conservation and restoration

There is a need of immediate conservation and restoration for the Narasimha temple Narasapur.

See also

 North Karnataka
 Tourism in North Karnataka
 Ranebennur
 Haveri
 Galaganatha
 Mylara Lingeshwara Temple at Mylara
 Hangal
 Bankapur
 Kaginele

References

External links

Cities and towns in Haveri district
Chalukya dynasty
Western Chalukya Empire